Flavio Roma (born 21 June 1974) is an Italian former professional footballer who played as a goalkeeper.

Club career
Roma started his career in the youth teams of Lazio. He was the third goalkeeper behind Luca Marchegiani and Fernando Orsi before leaving the club to play for clubs in Serie B and Serie C1. In 1999, he was signed by the Serie A side Piacenza as part of Simone Inzaghi's deal, replacing Valerio Fiori as the first choice in his role, but the team was relegated at the end of season.

Monaco
In 2001, he was signed by Monaco, then coached by Didier Deschamps, where he was the first choice goalkeeper ahead of Tony Sylva and Stéphane Porato until the 2008–09 season, when he lost his place to Stéphane Ruffier. He was also in the squad that played the 2004 UEFA Champions League Final. During his stay at Monaco, he only missed three months in the 2005–06 season due to injuries, and a shoulder injury ruled him out of the second half of the 2001–02 season in February 2002.

During his career at Monaco, Roma rejected an opportunity to join English side Arsenal in order to sign a new contract with the club.

Milan
On 12 August 2009, Roma signed a one-year contract with Milan to replace Zeljko Kalac, who was released from the club by mutual consent. Upon joining Milan, Roma cited joining the club as a dream come true, and Roma was expected to compete for the starting position with Marco Storari while Christian Abbiati and Dida were recovering from injury. However, Milan manager Leonardo preferred Storari and, after his return from injury, Dida. In January 2010, Storari left for Sampdoria and Abbiati recovered from injury, making Roma the third-choice goalkeeper. At the end of the season, his contract was extended to an undisclosed length.

In 2011, Roma started in goal in two matches in the Coppa Italia against Bari and Sampdoria, earning a clean sheet against Bari and conceding only one goal away against Sampdoria. On 17 May 2011, Milan announced Roma extended his contract for an additional year.

On 13 May 2012, Roma announced he had played his last match for Milan.

Return to Monaco
On 2 August 2012, Roma signed for Monaco on a one-year deal on a free transfer. Following Monaco's promotion to Ligue 1, Roma made his first appearance in his second spell, where he came on as a substitute for Martin Sourzac in the second half, as Monaco won 2–1 against Tours. After making one appearance, Roma signed a contract extension. At the end of the season, he announced his retirement.

International career
Roma received his first call-up for Italy on 17 November 2004 for a friendly match as Marcello Lippi was trying to identify a back-up goalkeeper for Gianluigi Buffon. Roma made his debut on 30 March 2005 in a 0–0 friendly draw with Iceland after replacing Morgan De Sanctis at half-time. He played his first full match on 11 June 2005 against Ecuador. Due to injuries, Roma was not called up for warm-up friendlies ahead of the 2006 FIFA World Cup. He received his last call-up to date on 16 August 2006, Italy's first match after the 2006 World Cup.

Career statistics

Honours
Monaco
 Coupe de la Ligue: 2003
 Ligue 2: 2012–13
UEFA Champions League: runner-up 2003–04

Milan
 Serie A: 2010–11
 Supercoppa Italiana: 2011

References

External links

1974 births
Living people
Footballers from Rome
Italian footballers
Association football goalkeepers
Italian expatriate footballers
Italy international footballers
Mantova 1911 players
Venezia F.C. players
U.S. Fiorenzuola 1922 S.S. players
Calcio Foggia 1920 players
A.C. ChievoVerona players
Piacenza Calcio 1919 players
AS Monaco FC players
A.C. Milan players
Serie A players
Serie B players
Ligue 1 players
Ligue 2 players
Expatriate footballers in France
Expatriate footballers in Monaco
Italian expatriate sportspeople in France
Italian expatriate sportspeople in Monaco